The Somali crombec (Sylvietta isabellina) is a species of African warbler, formerly placed in the family Sylviidae.
It is found in Ethiopia, Kenya, Somalia, and Tanzania.
Its natural habitat is subtropical or tropical dry shrubland.

A subspecies gaekwari described by R.B. Sharpe and named after the Maharaja of Baroda Sayajirao Gaekwad III is considered to be indistinguishable from the nominate form.

References

Somali crombec
Birds of the Horn of Africa
Somali crombec
Taxonomy articles created by Polbot